Swingin' on the Moon is a 1960 album by Mel Tormé. The Moon is the connecting theme, and every track, but one, contains the word "Moon" in the title.

Track listing
 "Swingin' on the Moon" (Mel Tormé) – 3:32
 "Moonlight Cocktail" (Kim Gannon, Luckey Roberts) – 3:04
 "I Wished on the Moon" (Dorothy Parker, Ralph Rainger) – 3:56
 "Moon Song" (Sam Coslow, Arthur Johnston) – 3:16
 "How High the Moon" (Nancy Hamilton, Morgan Lewis) – 3:13
 "Don't Let That Moon Get Away" (Johnny Burke, James V. Monaco) –  2:39
 "Blue Moon" (Lorenz Hart, Richard Rodgers) – 3:46
 "A Velvet Affair" (Fred Reynolds, Sid Ramin) – 3:00
 "No Moon at All" (Redd Evans, Dave Mann) – 2:39
 "Moonlight in Vermont" (John Blackburn, Karl Suessdorf) – 3:05
 "Oh, You Crazy Moon" (Burke, Van Heusen) – 3:16
 "The Moon Was Yellow" (Fred E. Ahlert, Edgar Leslie) – 2:46

Personnel 
 Mel Tormé - vocals
 Russell Garcia - arranger, conductor

References

1960 albums
Mel Tormé albums
Albums arranged by Russell Garcia (composer)
Verve Records albums
Concept albums
Fiction set on the Moon
Works about the Moon
Albums conducted by Russell Garcia (composer)